The Water Tower is a newspaper distributed at the University of Vermont, Vermont, United States, that is intended for students, faculty, and staff of the university as well as members of the surrounding community.  Launched in early 2007, it is published weekly during the academic year with a current circulation of 2,500.  The Water Tower is available at many locations throughout the UVM campus.  In addition, all of the paper's articles can be read on The Water Tower'''s website.

The paper's articles include reflections on current events and student life, humor pieces, cartoons, and "Top Five" lists.The Water Tower's staff and writers are all UVM students. The paper is an officially recognized club and receives funding from UVM's Student Government Association (SGA).  Writing, editing, and managing The Water Tower'' is all on a completely volunteer basis—students do not receive course credit for working on the newspaper.

References
 New Paper On Campus: Seven Days-type publication to come to UVM as alternative to The Vermont Cynic By Laura Pedro (Vermont Cynic 6 Feb 2007) (free registration required to read second page of article)
 Drought ends for The Water Tower - Alternative student news mag moves beyond breaking even The Vermont Cynic By Lauren Katz (Vermont Cynic 3 May 2010)

External links 
 Official web site of The Water Tower

Student newspapers published in Vermont
University of Vermont
Publications established in 2007
2007 establishments in Vermont
Mass media in Burlington, Vermont